Isla Canela is a small island located south of the town of Ayamonte, in Andalusia, Spain, in Province of Huelva. The mouth of the Guadiana River is next to the island, and Portugal (across the river) can be easily seen from Isla Canela. Isla Canela is set within an area of pleasant coastal scenery with wide, sandy beaches,  dunes and salt marshes.  The island is a summer resort popular with mainly Spanish and Portuguese holidaymakers who are attracted to its beaches.

Beaches and Activities

The 7 kilometre beach is of fine, golden sand.   There is an 18-hole golf club, and a marina and commercial centre which provide amenities such as shops, bars and restaurants. Outdoor pursuits such as sailing, canoeing, motor boats, tennis, fishing and diving are available in the area. 
 

Cuisine

The region is famous for its grilled fish, especially sardines and deep fried calamares (squid). 

Climate

The climate in Isla Canela is mainly Mediterranean, with generally hot and dry summers and mild winters. The area is considered a year-round destination. 

Canela
Landforms of Andalusia